The House on the Borderland and Other Novels is a collection of short novels by British writer  William Hope Hodgson. It was published by Arkham House in 1946 in an edition of 3,014 copies.  The collection was reprinted by Gollancz in 2002, with a new introduction by China Miéville, as volume 33 of their Fantasy Masterworks series.

Contents

The House on the Borderland and Other Novels contains the following:

 "William Hope Hodgson, Master of the Weird and Fantastic" by H.C. Koenig
 The Boats of the 'Glen Carrig'
 The House on the Borderland
 The Ghost Pirates
 The Night Land
 "Bibliography" by A. Langley Searles

References

Sources

1946 American novels
American horror novels
American fantasy novels
American science fiction novels
Novels by William Hope Hodgson